Roberto de Lucena (born 18 April 1966) is a Brazilian politician as well as a writer and pastor. He has spent his political career representing São Paulo, having served as federal deputy representative since 2011.

Personal life
He is the son of Antonio Vieira de Lucena and Eunice Alves de Lucena. In addition to being a politician, de Lucena is a writer and a pastor of the Igreja Evangélica Pentecostal O Brasil Para Cristo.

Political career
Lucena voted in favor of the impeachment motion of then-president Dilma Rousseff. He voted in favor of tax reforms but against the 2017 Brazilian labor reform, and voted in favor of opening a corruption investigation into Rousseff's successor Michel Temer.

References

1966 births
Living people
People from Santa Isabel, São Paulo
Brazilian Pentecostal pastors
Green Party (Brazil) politicians
Podemos (Brazil) politicians
Members of the Chamber of Deputies (Brazil) from São Paulo